The List of voivodes of Kraków includes the positions in both Kraków Land (ziemia  krakówska) and Krakow Voivodeship

 Skarbimir (Skarbek)
 Klemens 1123-1168
 Mikołaj Gryfita ?-1202
 Marek z Brzeźnicy  1176-? 1226 
 Teodor Gryfita ?-1237
 Włodzimierz of Cracow 1191-1241
 Klement of Ruszcza ?-1256
 Klemens Latoszyński  1213-1265  
 Sulisław z Branic  1232-1283
 Piotr Bogoria 1240-1290  
 Mikołaj Łagiewnicki 1245-1290  
 Wierzbięta z Ruszczy  1246-1324
 Tomisław Mokrski  1276-1326 
 Mikołaj Bogoria  1291-1346  
 Andrzej 1309-1354  
 Mścigniew Czelej 1298-1357
 Imram  1312-1357  
 Andrzej Tęczyński 1318-1368 
 Dobiesław Kurozwęcki  1306-1397  
 Spytko II of Melsztyn  1351-1399 
 Jan z Tarnowa przed 1349-1409 
 Piotr Kmita 1348-1409  
 Jan Tarnowski 1367 -1433  
 Piotr Szafraniec ?-1437
 Jan Czyżowski  1373-1459 
 Jan z Tęczyna między (1408- 1410) - 1470
 Jan Pilecki 1410-1476 
 Dziersław Rytwiański 1414-1478
 Jan Rytwiański 1422-1479 
 Jan Amor Iunior Tarnowski 1425-1500
 Spytek III of Jarosław  1436-1519
 Piotr Kmita z Wiśnicza 1442-1505 
 Jan Feliks Tarnowski  1471-1507
 Mikołaj Kamieniecki  1460-1515 
 Krzysztof Szydłowiecki 1467-1532
 Andrzej Tęczyński ?-1536 
 Otto Chodecki  1467-1534
 Jan Amor Tarnowski  1488-1561
 Piotr Kmita Sobieński  1477-1553  
 Mikołaj Herburt Odnowski 1505-1555
 Stanisław Tęczyński 1521-1561 
 Spytek Wawrzyniec Jordan  1519-1580
 Stanisław Myszkowski 
 Stanisław Barzi  1529-1571 
 Jan Firlej 1515-1574  
 Piotr Zborowski
 Andrzej Tęczyński  ?-1588
 Mikołaj Firlej  1532-1601
 Mikołaj Zebrzydowski 1553-1620
 Jan Magnus Tęczyński 1579-1637
 Stanisław Lubomirski  1583-1649 
 Władysław Dominik Zasławski-Ostrogski 1618-1656
 Władysław Myszkowski 1600-1658
 Stanisław Rewera Potocki  1579-1667
 Michał Zebrzydowski 1617-1667
 Jan Wielopolski  1605-1668
 Aleksander Michał Lubomirski  1598-1677 
 Jan Leszczyński  1598-1693
 Dymitr Jerzy Wiśniowiecki  1631-1682
 Andrzej Potocki ?-1691
 Feliks Kazimierz Potocki  1633-1702
 Hieronim Augustyn Lubomirski  1633-1706 
 Marcin Kątski  1635-1710 
 Franciszek Lanckoroński  ok. 1645-1715  
 Janusz Antoni Wiśniowiecki  1678-1741
 Jerzy Dominik Lubomirski  1665-1727
 Franciszek Wielopolski  1658-1732
 Teodor Lubomirski  1683-1745
 Jan Klemens Branicki 1689-1771
 Wacław Rzewuski 1706-1779  
 Antoni Lubomirski 1715-1782
 Stanisław Kostka Dembiński 1708-1781
 Piotr Małachowski 1730-1797

References

See also
Voivodes of the Polish–Lithuanian Commonwealth

History of Kraków
Government officials of the Polish–Lithuanian Commonwealth
Polish titles